Kaikai Kitan/Ao no Waltz is the second EP by Japanese singer-songwriter Eve. It was released on December 23, 2020, by Toy's Factory. The EP consists of seven tracks and was supported by three singles: "Kaikai Kitan", "Ao no Waltz and "Shinkai". It is available in three versions: the Jujutsu Kaisen version with a special cover drawn by Sunghoo Park, the Josee, the Tiger and the Fish version with the cover by Nao Emoto and the regular version by Mah.

Background and release 
Ten months after her last comeback with the studio album Smile, it was announced on November 4, 2020, that Eve would release his first EP on December 23. The singles "Kaikai Kitan", "Ao no Waltz" and "Shinkai" were previously released as the soundtrack for the anime Jujutsu Kaisen and the movie Josee, the Tiger and the Fish, respectively. On November 20, the music video for "Kaikai Kitan" was released in collaboration with Jujutsu Kaisen. On December 21, the music video for "Ao no Waltz" with scenes from Josee, the Tiger and the Fish and on December 7, the music video for "Shinkai" were released.

The EP was released on December 23 through various music platforms.

Commercial performance 
The album sold 34,652 copies in its first week and peaked 3rd on the Oricon Album Chart.

Track listing

Charts

Sales

References 

2020 EPs
Toy's Factory albums